Cyperus brunneofibrosus is a species of sedge that is endemic to an area in Ethiopia and Somalia.

The species was first formally described by the botanist Kåre Arnstein Lye in 1995.

See also
 List of Cyperus species

References

brunneofibrosus
Flora of Ethiopia
Flora of Somalia
Plants described in 1995
Taxa named by Kåre Arnstein Lye